94.8 XFM is a Top 40 hit music radio station based in Kampala, Uganda that focuses on Urban Youth between the ages of 18-28. The station is jam packed with the Freshest Hit music and celebrity interviews in and around Kampala delivered by the best presenters in town.

XFM has been on the market for 9 years (since August 2011) and specializes in creating strong bonds with its listeners by delivering relevant, exciting and engaging content on the airwaves and on social media.

XFM's signal stretches up to Entebbe, Lugazi and Nkozi. We also stream online.

Background
XFM 94.8 went on air on August 1, 2011. It was formerly "Vision Voice", a station that was re-branded to improve its competitiveness. Some of the key shows on XFM include XAM with Dj Cisse from 6am to 10am every weekday, XZIT with Denzel starts at 3pm till 7pm every weekday and TXR.

References

External links 
"The 20-year journey of FM radio in Uganda"
"FM Radio broadcasting in Uganda turns 20 this month"

Ugandan music
Radio stations in Uganda
Kumusha